Arkady Nikitich Vorobyov (3 October 1924 – 22 December 2012) was a Soviet and Russian weightlifter, weightlifting coach, scientist and writer. He competed at the 1952, 1956 and 1960 Olympics and won one bronze and two gold medals. Between 1950 and 1960 he set 16 official world records. Later for many years he led the national team and the Soviet weightlifting program. In 1995 he was inducted into the International Weightlifting Federation Hall of Fame.

Biography
Vorobyov was born in the village of Mordovo in Tambov Oblast, Russia. During World War II he served in the Soviet Navy on the Black Sea. After the war he worked on the restoration of the Odessa sea port, clearing the mines as a diver. There Vorobyov got acquainted with weightlifting, his first competition being the sea port championship.

He later won several world (1953–55, 1957 and 1958) and European titles (1950, 1953–55, 1958) competing in the light-heavyweight and middle-heavyweight categories. Between 1950 and 1960 he set 26 world records, 16 of them became official: two in the press, nine in the snatch, one in the clean and jerk and four in the total. For many years Vorobyov captained the Soviet weightlifting team, and after retiring from competitions became its head coach.

In 1957 Vorobyov graduated from a medical institute; in 1962 he defended a PhD and in 1970 a habilitation on weightlifting training at the Institute of Aviation and Space Medicine in Moscow. Since 1977 he was the rector of the Moscow Oblast Institute of Physical Culture and Sports. Over his scientific career Vorobyov published five textbooks and about 200 scientific papers on weightlifting. He was a leader of the Soviet weightlifting training program and one of the first Soviet scientists to apply computers to the training process. His students included elite coaches and sportsmen from Russia, Bulgaria, Cuba, Hungary and many other countries.

References

External links
 Encyclopædia Britannica on Arkady Vorobyov
 
 

1924 births
2012 deaths
20th-century Russian male writers
21st-century Russian male writers
Communist Party of the Soviet Union members
Honoured Masters of Sport of the USSR
Merited Coaches of the Soviet Union
Recipients of the Medal "For Courage" (Russia)
Recipients of the Medal of Zhukov
Recipients of the Order "For Merit to the Fatherland", 4th class
Recipients of the Order of Friendship of Peoples
Recipients of the Order of Lenin
Recipients of the Order of the Red Banner of Labour
Olympic weightlifters of the Soviet Union
Russian male weightlifters
Russian male writers
Soviet male weightlifters
Soviet male writers
Weightlifters at the 1952 Summer Olympics
Weightlifters at the 1956 Summer Olympics
Weightlifters at the 1960 Summer Olympics
Olympic gold medalists for the Soviet Union
Olympic bronze medalists for the Soviet Union
Armed Forces sports society athletes
Soviet military personnel of World War II
Olympic medalists in weightlifting
Medalists at the 1960 Summer Olympics
Medalists at the 1956 Summer Olympics
Medalists at the 1952 Summer Olympics
European champions in weightlifting
European Weightlifting Championships medalists
World Weightlifting Championships medalists